Ah! Leluiah! is the eleventh studio album and the first Christmas album by American rock singer Donnie Iris, released on November 18, 2010.  The project was first announced by keyboardist/songwriter/producer/legalist Mark Avsec in February 2010 in an interview with Cleveland Scene. (The album title is a pun on Iris' big hit song, Ah! Leah!.)

Track listing 
 "Introduction"
 "Angels We Have Heard on High"
 "We Wish You a Merry Christmas"
 "Blue Christmas" 
 "Emmanuel"
 "O Come All Ye Faithful" 
 "White Christmas" 
 "Carol of the Bells"
 "Alleluyah Sasa! (He Is Born)"
 "This Child" (original song, written by Avsec)
 "Ave Maria"
 "We Wish You a Merry Christmas" (reprise)
 "Panis angelicus"
 "The Hallelujah Chorus"
 "Auld Lang Syne"
 "Have Yourself a Merry Little Christmas"
 "Silent Night"

Personnel 
 Donnie Iris – lead vocals
 Mark Avsec – keyboards and vocals
 Marty Lee Hoenes – guitar and vocals
 Paul Goll – bass and vocals
 Kevin Valentine – drums

References 

Donnie Iris albums
Albums produced by Mark Avsec
2010 albums
2010 Christmas albums